Ernst Wilhelm Julius Bornemann (12 April 1915 – 4 June 1995), also known by his self-chosen anglicisation Ernest Borneman, was a German crime writer, filmmaker, anthropologist, ethnomusicologist, psychoanalyst, sexologist, communist agitator, jazz musician and critic.

Bibliography

Novels
The Face on the Cutting-Room Floor (1937) (as Cameron McCabe); London : Picador Classic, 2016 (with an introduction by Jonathan Coe), 
Tremolo (1938)
Face the Music (1954) 
Tomorrow Is Now (1959)
The Compromisers (1961)
The Man Who Loved Women (aka Landscape with Nudes) (1968)

Screenplays
Face The Music (1954), aka The Black Glove in the U.S.A.
Bang, You're Dead (1954), co-written with Guy Elmes, aka Game Of Danger

Jazz writings
"Swing Music. An Encyclopaedia of Jazz" (unpublished typescript, 580pp., 1940)
A Critic Looks at Jazz (1946; collected criticism from his column in the jazz periodical The Record Changer, "An Anthropologist Looks at Jazz"; the only jazz book ever published by Borneman)
 "The Roots of Jazz", in Nat Hentoff and Albert J. McCarthy, eds., Jazz (New York: Rinehart, 1959)

Non-fiction
Lexikon der Liebe und Erotik (1968)
Psychoanalyse des Geldes. Eine kritische Untersuchung psychoanalytischer Geldtheorien (1973)
Studien zu Befreiung des Kindes, 3 vols. (1973)
Der obszöne Wortschatz der Deutschen—Sex im Volksmund (1974)
Das Patriarchat. Ursprung und Zukunft unseres Gesellschaftssystems (1975)
Die Ur-Szene. Eine Selbstanalyse (autobiographical, 1977)
Reifungsphasen der Kindheit. Sexuelle Entwicklungspsychologie (1981)
Die Welt der Erwachsenen in den verbotenen Reimen deutschsprachiger Stadtkinder (1982)
Rot-weiß-rote Herzen. Das Liebes-, Ehe- und Geschlechtsleben der Alpenrepublik (1984)
Das Geschlechtsleben des Kindes. Beiträge zur Kinderanalyse und Sexualpädologie (1985)
Die neue Eifersucht. Starke Männer zeigen Schwäche: Sie werden eifersüchtig (1986)
Ullstein Enzyklopädie der Sexualität (1990)
Sexuelle Marktwirtschaft. Vom Waren- und Geschlechtsverkehr in der bürgerlichen Gesellschaft (1992)
Die Zukunft der Liebe (2001) (his last book)

Borneman was also a scriptwriter for the British TV series The Adventures of Aggie (1956) about the adventures of a fashion designer on international assignments.

Borneman directed the 20 minute Canadian documentary Northland (1942) and also the 15 minute documentary written by Leslie McFarlane, Target - Berlin (Objectif Berlin) (1944).

References

Further reading
"Afterword". In: Cameron McCabe: The Face on the Cutting-Room Floor (Gregg Press: Boston, Mass., 1981) (includes the tapescript of a long interview with Borneman conducted in 1979 by Reinhold Aman, the editor of the scholarly U.S. periodical Maledicta; reprinted in the 1986 Penguin edition of the novel)
Ein lüderliches Leben. Portrait eines Unangepaßten, ed. Sigrid Standow (2001).

External links
Borneman the jazz fan (in German)
Über Ernest Borneman, Wilhelm-Reich-Blätter, Heft 3, No.4 (1979), pp. 74–86 (in German).

1915 births
1995 suicides
20th-century German novelists
German communists
German crime fiction writers
German male novelists
German sexologists
Writers from Berlin
Jewish emigrants from Nazi Germany to the United Kingdom
Suicides in Austria
1995 deaths